Panzano is the name of five frazioni (hamlets) of the following Italian and Spanish communes:

Campogalliano
Castelfranco Emilia
Greve in Chianti
Monfalcone
 Huesca